The sojm (Ruthenian: Соймъ) was an early parliament in the Grand Duchy of Lithuania. It was active from 1445 to 1569, when it was officially abolished by the Union of Lublin. The Sojm was an irregular gathering of the Lithuanian nobility, called as needed by the Grand Duke or during an interregnum by the Lithuanian Council of Lords (an early government). The meetings would usually last one or two weeks. Sojm gradually evolved from a meeting of the most powerful magnates to a full legislative institution representing all of the nobility. The Sojm was not the main political player as it was overshadowed by the Council of Lords. The Union of Lublin created a new state, the Polish–Lithuanian Commonwealth, and joined the Sojm of Lithuania with Sojm of Poland into one Sejm of the Polish–Lithuanian Commonwealth. However, the Sojm continued to convene under the name of Lithuanian Convocation. In total there were 40 Sojm and 37 Convocations.

History

The first traces of large nobility meetings can be found in the Treaty of Salynas of 1398 and the Union of Horodło of 1413. It is considered that the first Sojm met in Hrodna in 1445 during talks between Casimir IV Jagiellon and the Council of Lords. Soon influence of the nobility grew as Casimir's privileges released veldamas, dependent peasants, from their taxes to the state. That meant a significant increase in nobility's revenue. As the Muscovite–Lithuanian Wars raged the country almost continuously between 1492 and 1582, the Grand Duke needed more tax revenues to finance the army and had to call the Sojm more frequently. In exchange for cooperation, the nobility demanded various privileges, including strengthening of the Sojm. 

At first the Sojm did not have the legislative power. It would debate on foreign and domestic affairs, taxes, wars, state budget. At the beginning of the 16th century, the Sojm acquired some legislative powers. The Sojm could petition the Grand Duke to pass certain laws. The Duke usually granted the request as he needed nobility's support and cooperation. At first members of the Sojm were members of the Council of Lords and high state officials. Only gradually all interested nobles could attend the meetings. No invitation was necessary to attend. As the importance of Sojm grew, nobles from more distant regions started electing representatives from their districts and sending them to the meeting. However, the Sojm was dominated by the magnates as they were much more politically active and lesser nobles were more passive observers. However, gradually the lesser nobles understood that the Sojm gave them power to block new taxes and by mid-16th century they started to demand more privileges for themselves. Thus the Sojm shifted from magnate-controlled political tool to a representation of all nobles. This shift was influenced by a similar movement in Poland.

Major reforms were carried out between 1564 and 1566, just before the Union of Lublin. According to the Second Statute of Lithuania, the Sojm acquired full legislative powers. It was composed of two houses: the upper house, called Senate, was the equivalent to the former Council of Lords and the lower house was made up of representatives of each district of the state. No longer any member of the nobility could participate: each of the 28 powiats could send only two delegates. It started a tradition of local Sojm (called seimelis) to elect the representatives.

When the separate Sojm for Lithuania was officially abolished in 1569, it adopted the name of Lithuanian Convocations and continued to meet until the partitions of the Polish–Lithuanian Commonwealth in 1795. It debated matters concerning the Grand Duchy of Lithuania or tried to establish a common position among Lithuanian delegates before departing for the Sojm of the Commonwealth. The convocations retained basic structures (upper and lower houses) and procedures of the Sojm: each powiat could send only two representatives. Convocations were called by the Grand Duke, who also ratified its decisions and included them in official law books.

See also
Sejm of Central Lithuania

References

Legal history of Lithuania
Lithuanian constitutional law
Legal history of Belarus
15th century in Lithuania
16th century in Lithuania